Xiaolongbao refers to a type of small Chinese steamed bun (baozi) traditionally prepared in a xiaolong, a small bamboo steaming basket, hence the name. Xiaolongbao are often referred to as a kind of "dumpling", but should not be confused with Chinese jiaozi or wonton. 

In some parts of China and overseas, xiaolongbao may specifically refer to a kind of soup dumpling, the tangbao (Chinese 汤包) of Jiangnan cuisine, which are strongly associated with Shanghai and Wuxi. Shengjianbao are very similar to tangbao but are pan-fried instead of steamed.

Origins 
"Xiaolongbao" originated in Changzhou, Jiangsu province, by Wan Hua Tea House in the years of Daoguang Emperor (1820 to 1850). Xiaolongbao evolved from the guantangbao (soup-filled dumplings/buns) from Kaifeng, Henan province, the capital city of Northern Song Dynasty (AD 960–1127).

There are numerous styles of xiaolongbao in Jiangsu cuisine. Shanghai-style xiaolongbao originated in Nanxiang, which was a neighboring village of Shanghai in Jiangsu that eventually ended up becoming an outer suburb of Shanghai's Jiading District. The inventor of xiaolongbao sold them in his first store in Nanxiang next to the town's notable park, Guyi Garden. From there the xiaolongbao expanded into downtown Shanghai and outward. The Suzhou and Wuxi styles are larger (sometimes twice as large as a Nanxiang-style soup dumpling) and have sweeter fillings. The Nanjing style is smaller with an almost translucent skin and less meat.

Two specialist xiaolongbao restaurants have a particularly long history. One is Nanxiang Mantou Dian (Nanxiang Bun Shop), which derives from the original store in Nanxiang but is now located in the Yu Garden area. It is famed for its crab-meat-filled buns. The other is Gulong Restaurant, at the original site next to Guyi Garden in Nanxiang.

Ingredients 
Chinese buns, in general, may be divided into two types, depending on the degree of leavening of the flour skin. Buns can be made with leavened or unleavened dough. Those made with unleavened dough use clear water for mixing, the skin is thin and the fillings large. It is frequently made in Nanxiang but is imitated elsewhere, calling it Xiang-style. Steamed buns made with raised flour are seen throughout China and are what is usually referred to as mantou. Steamed xiaolongbao made with partially raised flour are more commonly seen in the south. This means that their skin is tender, smoother, and somewhat translucent, rather than being white and fluffy. As is traditional for buns of various sizes in the Jiangnan region, xiaolongbao is pinched at the top prior to steaming, so the skin has a circular cascade of ripples around the crown.

Xiaolongbao are traditionally filled with pork. More modern innovations include other meats, seafood, shrimp, crab meat, and vegetarian fillings.

Soup dumplings are created by wrapping solid meat aspic inside the skin alongside the meat filling. Heat from steaming then melts the gelatin-gelled aspic into soup. In modern times, refrigeration has made the process of making tangbao during hot weather easier, since making gelled aspic is much more difficult at room temperature.

Serving
Xiaolongbao are traditionally eaten for breakfast. The buns are served hot in the bamboo baskets in which they were steamed, usually on a bed of dried leaves or paper mat, although some restaurants now use napa cabbage instead. The buns are usually dipped in Zhenjiang vinegar with chili crisp.

Traditionally, tangbao soup dumplings are a kind of dim sum (à la carte item) or "xiaochi" (snack). The buns are usually dipped in Zhenjiang vinegar with ginger slivers. They are traditionally served with a clear soup on the side. Around Shanghai, "tangbao" may be eaten throughout the day, although usually not for breakfast. They form part of a traditional Jiangnan-style morning tea. In Guangdong and the West, it is sometimes served as a dish during Cantonese tea time. Frozen tangbao are now mass-produced and a popular frozen food sold worldwide.

Types

Changzhou 
The modern form of Xiaolongbao originated from Qing Dynasty. A place named YingGui Teahouse is where people in ChangZhou go to have Xiaolongbao. Xiaolongbao in Changzhou is known for its thin wraps, great taste of its ingredients, and the soup that spills out when taken a bite. Among the types, crab filled Xiaolongbao is the most well known type in Changzhou that are served after the mid autumn festival.

Shanghai 
Nanxiang Xiaolongbao in Shanghai have around a hundred year of history. They are known for their unique technique of making the wrappers as well as secret ingredients of the fillings.

Tianjin 
Goubuli Xiaolongbao is the most famous Xiaolongbao in the northern China. Goubuli is founded in 1858 by a young man named Gouzi, who named his xiaolongbao after himself as Goubuli later. Goubuli Xiaolongbao has strictly 18 wrinkles on each dumpling due to its creator's unique method of making it. Goubuli Xiaolongbao were served to one of the famous queen's mother in Chinese history as a famous dish from Tianjin.

Kaifeng 
Kaifeng Xiaolongbao, created in Song Dynasty, is also known as soup filled Xiaolongbao. Many famous cooks created their own ways of making soup filled dumplings in Kaifeng and improved the techniques throughout history. Kaifeng Xiaolongbao looks like "a lantern" when you lift the dumpling and "a flower" when it sits in the steaming basket.

See also

 Baozi
 Din Tai Fung
 Dumpling
 Jiaozi
 List of steamed foods
 List of buns
 Momo (dumpling)
 Shanghainese cuisine
 Shengjian mantou
 Siopao
 Salteña, another dumpling with a gelatin-based liquid filling

Explanatory notes

Citations 

Cantonese cuisine
Chinese breads
Dim sum
Dumplings
Hong Kong cuisine
Hubei cuisine
Jiangsu cuisine
Shanghai cuisine
Steamed foods
Stuffed dishes
Taiwanese cuisine